The Undisputed Truth is the third studio album by American hip hop artist Brother Ali, his second major release. It was released on April 10, 2007 on Rhymesayers Entertainment. The album is produced entirely by Ant of Atmosphere. The first single, "Truth Is", was released on January 5, 2007. The second single is "Uncle Sam Goddamn" which was released on May 4, 2007.

Promotion
In the period of promotion before the release of the album, several videos were released of various hip hop icons talking about Brother Ali and this upcoming album. In one video, Slug from Atmosphere is shown getting a tattoo while praising Ali and the new album; at the end of the video, the camera reveals that he has just had the title of the album tattooed in large letters across the side of his neck. (the tattoo however was not real, since it does not appear on his neck in interviews or live performances following the release of that video)

Popular culture 
The song "Whatcha Got" is featured in the EA Sports video game Madden 08.

Controversy 
Before the preparation for touring for the album, Brother Ali was invited to a Verizon sponsored tour with Gym Class Heroes. However, Brother Ali then released the music video for "Uncle Sam Goddamn". Due to the song's content, which included him being critical of the United States government, Verizon ultimately withdrew its sponsorship of Ali, causing him to truncate parts of his 2007 tour.

Sales
The album debuted at number 69 on the U.S. Billboard 200, selling about 11,000 copies in its first week.

Track listing

Awards
2007 HipHopDX Awards
"Slept On Album of the Year" (nominated)

References

External links
 Official Website
 Rhymesayers Entertainment
 

2007 albums
Brother Ali albums
Rhymesayers Entertainment albums
Warner Music Group albums
Albums produced by Ant (producer)